Famicom Disk System games were released only in Japan, for the aftermarket floppy drive compatible with Nintendo's Famicom home video game console. Games released in North America and Europe are in the list of Nintendo Entertainment System games. Games released for the Famicom on cartridges are in the List of Famicom games.



List
This list consists of  officially licensed Famicom Disk System games.

Unlicensed games

Unreleased games

References

External links
List of Famicom Disk games with all serial numbers and additional info (In Japanese)
Famicom World's FDS game database

Famicom Disk System
 
Famicom Disk System
Famicom Disk System